Edward Fitzgerald Burns (born January 29, 1968) is an American actor and filmmaker. He first came to attention, performing all four duties, in The Brothers McMullen (1995), his ultra low-budget independent film that went on to be a worldwide hit. Other film appearances include Saving Private Ryan (1998), The Holiday (2006), Man on a Ledge (2012), Friends with Kids (2012), and Alex Cross (2012). Burns directed movies such as She's the One (1996), Sidewalks of New York (2001), and The Fitzgerald Family Christmas (2012). On television, he starred as Bugsy Siegel in the TNT crime drama series Mob City and as Terry Muldoon in TNT's Public Morals.

Early life
Burns was born in Woodside, Queens, New York, the son of Molly (née McKenna), a federal agency manager, and Edward J. Burns, a public relations spokesman and police officer. He was raised a Roman Catholic. Burns is the second of three children (with siblings Mary and Brian) and is of Irish, and one-quarter Swedish descent. He was raised in Valley Stream, New York, on Long Island. He briefly attended Chaminade High School before transferring to Hewlett High School. After high school, Burns attended, from 1987 to 1992, SUNY Oneonta, University at Albany, and Hunter College.

Career
Burns got his start in the film industry right after college as a production assistant on the Oliver Stone film, The Doors. While working as a gofer at Entertainment Tonight, he financed, produced, directed and starred in his first film The Brothers McMullen in his spare time, which was largely shot in his hometown of Valley Stream. Once he completed the film, he was able to get a copy to Robert Redford after an ET junket interview for Quiz Show at the Rhiga Royal Hotel in Manhattan. In 1996, Burns wrote, directed and starred in the ensemble drama She's the One with Jennifer Aniston, Cameron Diaz and Amanda Peet, as well as Sidewalks of New York in 2001.

Burns is also known for his acting work on movies such as Saving Private Ryan (1998), Life or Something Like It (2002), and Confidence (2003).  Looking for Kitty (2004), which Burns wrote, directed and starred in, was shot with a hand-held $3,000 digital Panasonic AG-DVX100 camera with a Mini35 adapter. The film's entire budget was $200,000 and was filmed in New York City with a tiny crew and without standard permits. Burns discussed this unusual film-making process in the director's commentary on the DVD and wrote in the Director's Letter "If you are an aspiring filmmaker, in this day of inflating budgets and runaway production, the truth is you can make a movie for no money in New York ... and have a blast".

His film Purple Violets premiered exclusively on iTunes on November 20, 2007. Burns began a string of guest appearances on the HBO original series Entourage midway through season 3, as well as appearing as Grace Adler's boyfriend in Will & Grace. In Entourage, Burns plays himself and is (within the context of the series) writing a new TV series in which Johnny Drama is able to land a part. In 2007, Burns announced plans to partner with Virgin Comics to create a series entitled Dock Walloper. Burns plans to use the comic series as a springboard to a film of the same story.

In March 2009, The Lynch Pin, a series of shorts starring, written and directed by Burns were released via the internet. The ten episodes are only available to view online  and future plans for the project are unknown.

With the modest success of Purple Violets, Burns was considering taking a studio directing assignment to make money. After reading a few scripts and taking a few meetings, he chose to remain a writer/director. He then wrote Nice Guy Johnny and shot it quickly, on the RED One camera, for a reported $25,000 with a small crew. Nice Guy Johnny premiered at the Tribeca Film Festival in 2010.

To coincide with the 10th anniversary of the Tribeca Film Festival in 2011, Burns wrote a movie, Newlyweds, that he also directed and starred in. Following a model similar to Nice Guy Johnny, Newlyweds was shot on the Canon 5D, with an even smaller crew, for $9000, in 12 days. The film premiered at the Tribeca Film Festival in 2011 as the closing night film. He claimed on Twitter that the $9,000 budget broke out to "5k for actors, 2k insurance, 2k food and drink. 9k in the can." In 2013 Burns starred as real-life gangster Bugsy Siegel in Frank Darabont's miniseries, Mob City.

In 2012, Burns set up a screenwriting contest with the web startup Scripped for a crowdsourced screenplay which he intended to help get produced.

Personal life
Burns is married to model Christy Turlington and they have two children, Grace (born 2003) and Finn (born 2006). He and Turlington are Catholic. He is an advisor to ICX Media, an ad-tech audience analytics data firm.

Filmography

Awards and nominations

References

External links

1968 births
American male film actors
University at Albany, SUNY alumni
Hunter College alumni
George W. Hewlett High School alumni
American people of Irish descent
American people of Swedish descent
Living people
Male actors from New York City
People from Valley Stream, New York
20th-century American male actors
21st-century American male actors
People from Woodside, Queens
State University of New York at Oneonta alumni
Film directors from New York City
Catholics from New York (state)